Voids in Mineral Aggregate or VMA is the intergranular space occupied by asphalt and air in a compacted asphalt mixture. In a component diagram, it is the sum of the volume of air and the volume of effective asphalt. The volume of absorbed asphalt is not considered to be a part of VMA because it is part of the pore structure of the mineral aggregate.

VMA= Veffective asphalt + Vair voids

References
 Asphalt Mixture Volumetrics.

Asphalt